The Maltese film industry produced one film in 2014. This article fully lists all non-pornographic films, including short films, that had a release date in that year and which were at least partly made by Malta. It does not include films first released in previous years that had release dates in 2014.  Also included is an overview of the major events in Maltese film, including film festivals and awards ceremonies, as well as lists of those films that have been particularly well received, both critically and financially.

Major Releases

See also

 2014 in film
 2014 in Malta
 List of Maltese submissions for the Academy Award for Best Foreign Language Film

References

External links

Maltese
Films
2014